Suya or tsire is traditional smoked spiced meat skewer which originates from Northern Nigeria, Hausa Land and is a popular food item across West Africa. Suya (also pronounced Soya) is a big part of Hausa culture and food and is historically prepared and made by Hausa men 'Mai nama' (not women). Suya is generally made with skewered beef, ram, or chicken. Innards such as kidney, liver and tripe are also used. The thinly sliced meat is marinated in various spices, which include traditional Hausa dehydrated peanut cookie called 'kwulikwuli', salt, vegetable oil and other spices and flavorings, and then barbecued. There are many variation of Suya in traditional Hausa cooking (such as Balangu, Kilishi etc..), but the most popular being suya. Suya is traditionally served with an extra helpings of dried pepper mixed, traditional hausa spices and sliced onions. It is also traditionally served in Hausa culture with a side serving of Hausa Masa (fermented rice/grain/corn cakes). Halal meat preparation methods are normally used, especially in the northern parts of Nigeria where it originates as is customary with traditional Hausa foods, where the suspicion of nonconformity to Muslim dietary prohibitions in Suya preparation has been known to cause riots. A dried version of Suya is called Kilishi. It can be eaten with Masa, Kosai, Garri or Ogi.

There is no standard recipe for the production of the complex mixture of spices and additives which make up the Suya marinade (called Yaji) and the spice mix served with it.  Ingredients may vary according to personal and regional preferences.

Although Suya is a traditional Hausa Nigeria dish, it has permeated the Nigerian society, being affordable for all and available everywhere. It has been called a unifying factor in Nigeria. Suya has become a Nigerian national dish with different regions claiming the superiority of their recipe and methods of preparation, but similar grilled meat recipes are common in many West African countries.

See also

 Dibi
 Kyinkyinga
 List of African dishes

References

External links

 Suya Meat and Vendor (Photograph), News Agency of Nigeria.
 Suya recipe

Nigerian cuisine
Ghanaian cuisine
Grilled skewers
Nigerien cuisine
Hausa-language culture
Cameroonian cuisine
Sudanese cuisine